Siləyli or Seleyli or Sileyli may refer to:
Siləyli, Qabala, Azerbaijan
Siləyli, Zardab, Azerbaijan